Benishe Dillard-Roberts (born August 20, 1977) is an American female volleyball player. She was part of the United States women's national volleyball team.

She participated in the 2001 FIVB Volleyball Women's World Grand Champions Cup.

References

External links
http://www.seattletimes.com/sports/prep-flashback-volleyball-takes-former-k-m-star-around-world/
http://pac-tx.com/meet-our-team/
http://www.oursportscentral.com/services/releases/quest-middle-blocker-roberts-named-player-of-the-month/n-1964566

1977 births
Living people
American women's volleyball players
Place of birth missing (living people)
African-American volleyball players
21st-century African-American sportspeople
21st-century African-American women
20th-century African-American sportspeople
Long Beach State Beach women's volleyball players
20th-century African-American women